Events from the year 1608 in France

Incumbents
 Monarch – Henry IV

Events
 Until March – "Great Winter": very severe weather. The Rhône is frozen.
 1 January – Inauguration in Paris of the Grand Galerie linking the Louvre and Tuileries Palaces.
 23 January – Treaty of The Hague, a defensive alliance between France and the United Provinces of the Netherlands, negotiated for France by Pierre Jeannin, is signed.
 25 March: Annunciation: Following a sermon by Franciscan Father Basile, reform of the abbey of Port-Royal-des-Champs by abbess Mother Marie Angélique Arnauld is initiated.
 March: Ursulines arrive in Paris.
 1–16 October: Political assembly of Protestants at Jargeau.

Births
18 March – Paul Ragueneau, Jesuit missionary (died 1680)
28 March – Léon Bouthillier, comte de Chavigny, Foreign Minister (died 1652)
15 April – Honoré Fabri, mathematician (died 1688)
24 April – Gaston, Duke of Orléans, third son of King Henry IV (died 1660)
15 May – René Goupil, Jesuit lay missionary (martyred 1642)
20 August – Ludovicus a S. Carolo, monk (died 1670)
20 September – Jean-Jacques Olier, Catholic priest (died 1657)
3 October – Nicole, Duchess of Lorraine, noble (died 1657)
Full date missing – Antoine Le Maistre, lawyer, author and translator (died 1658)

Deaths
 
18 January – Jacques Couet, pastor (born 1546)
16 February – Nicolas Rapin, magistrate and satirist (born 1535)
27 February – Henri, Duke of Montpensier, noble (born 1573)
8 March – René Benoît, religious confessor (born 1521)
12 April – Pierre Brûlart, seigneur de Genlis, statesman (born c.1535)
14 May – Charles III, Duke of Lorraine (born 1543)
28 September – Henri, Duke of Joyeuse, military general (born 1563)

Full date missing
Jean Vauquelin de la Fresnaye, poet (born 1536)
Nicolas de Montreux, nobleman, novelist, poet and playwright (born c.1561)
Petrus Morinus, biblical scholar (born 1531)

See also

References

1600s in France